The North Wildwood School District is a community public school district that serves students in kindergarten through eighth grade from North Wildwood, in Cape May County, New Jersey, United States The district also serves students from West Wildwood, which has a non-operating district that sends students to North Wildwood District in a sending/receiving relationship.

As of the 2021–22 school year, the district, comprised of one school, had an enrollment of 207 students and 33.0 classroom teachers (on an FTE basis), for a student–teacher ratio of 6.3:1.

The district is classified by the New Jersey Department of Education as being in District Factor Group "A", the lowest of eight groupings. District Factor Groups organize districts statewide to allow comparison by common socioeconomic characteristics of the local districts. From lowest socioeconomic status to highest, the categories are A, B, CD, DE, FG, GH, I and J.

For ninth through twelfth grades, public school students from North Wildwood attend Wildwood High School in Wildwood as part of a sending/receiving relationship with the Wildwood Public School District, together with students from West Wildwood and Wildwood Crest. As of the 2021–22 school year, the high school had an enrollment of 263 students and 31.0 classroom teachers (on an FTE basis), for a student–teacher ratio of 8.5:1.

History
By 2020 enrollment had declined since many North Wildwood properties were redeveloped from being rental area to having summer and single family housing. Additionally rentals had declined in West Wildwood due to flooding.

Schools
Margaret Mace School served an enrollment of 186 students in grades PreK-8 in the 2021–21 school year.
Patricia Donlan, Assistant Principal

In 2019 North Wildwood district received 20 students from West Wildwood, making up 11% of the North Wildwood district enrollment.

Administration
Core members of the district's administration are:
Christopher Armstrong, Superintendent
Jamie Shoemaker, Business Administrator / Board Secretary

Board of education
The district's board of education, comprised of nine members, sets policy and oversees the fiscal and educational operation of the district through its administration. The West Wildwood district sends a non-voting representative to the board. As a Type II school district, the board's trustees are elected directly by voters to serve three-year terms of office on a staggered basis, with three seats up for election each year held (since 2012) as part of the November general election. The board appoints a superintendent to oversee the district's day-to-day operations and a business administrator to supervise the business functions of the district.

References

External links

North Wildwood School District
 
School Data for the North Wildwood School District, National Center for Education Statistics

New Jersey District Factor Group A
North Wildwood, New Jersey
West Wildwood, New Jersey
School districts in Cape May County, New Jersey
Public K–8 schools in New Jersey
Schools in Cape May County, New Jersey